Ong Eng Hong (1935 – 2018) was an Australian badminton player. In 1955, he competed in the Australian National Badminton Championships and made his debut as the champion of the men's singles.

Early life
Ong was born in 1936 in Kuala Lumpur, Malaysia. His ancestral home is in Jiangdou, a small village in Fuqing, Fujian, China. His father Ong Cho Tek was a businessman dealing in the early car and bicycle spare parts trade in Singapore and Malaysia. He has 18 siblings.

Personal life
Ong and his wife, Goh Soh Meng, were married on the 22 December 1962 in St Kilda, Victoria. They have 2 children.

Death
Ong died in 2018 at the age of 83.

References

1935 births
2018 deaths
Australian male badminton players
Malaysian emigrants to Australia
Sportspeople from Kuala Lumpur
Malaysian people of Chinese descent
Australian people of Chinese descent
Sportspeople from Melbourne
University of Melbourne alumni